Khemupsorn "Cherry" Sirisukha (RTGS: "Khem-apson Sirisukha", b. August 28, 1980 in Nan Province, Northern Thailand)  is a popular Thai actress.  She has acted in a number of dramas, including Kaew Tah Pee and Thur Kue Duang Jai.  Besides acting, she is also a model and a host  She got Asia Model Festival Awards in 2011.

Biography
Khemupsorn Sirisukha was the third child of Lieutenant general Yutthana Sirisukha and Princess Niramit (née Mahavansanandana), Princess of Nan. She was a sister of  Police Major Songprod Sirisukha and Ramavadi "Poupée" Nakchattri. She has ancestry royalty of Nan descent from her mother.

In addition to her work in the entertainment industry, she is also an environmental activist.

Film
 Satang (2000)
 Opapatika (2007)
The Happiness of Kati (2009)

TV
 Police Jub Khamoey (1996) with Jukrit Ammarat, Thanakorn Poshyananda and Pongpat Wachirabunjong
 a Peesaj (1996)
 Than Chai Kammalor (1996)
 Jub Tai Wai Rai Sai Samorn (1998)
 Khery Likey (1999)
 Fon Tok Khee Moo Lai Khon Arai Ma Pob Kan (1999)
 Phoo Dee E-Sarn (2001)
 Sue 11 Tua (2001)
 Lang Likhit (2001)
 Phae Kao (2002) with Ken Theeradej
 Ley Lub Salub Rang (2002)
 Khun Por Tua Jing Khong Tae(2004)
 Reun Mai See beige (2004)
 Theppabut Nai Fun (2004)
 Dao Long Fah (2005) with Atichart Chumnanon
 Bodyguard Dad Deaw (2005)
 Thur Kue Duang Jai (2006)
 Kaew Tah Pee (2006) - played with Jesdaporn Pholdee
 Pra Jan Son Dao (unreleased)
 Jamleuy Gammathep (2009)
 Mae ka khanom wan(2009) with Mart Krissada
 Nuer Mek (2010) with Chakrit Yamnam
 Rak Ork Arkard (2012)

Stage play
 Onlamarn Lang Ban Saithong
 Thur Kue Duang Jai - The Musical

Ancestors

References

External links

 http://www.thaitv3.com/ch3/ดาราช่อง3/68/เข็มอัปสร-สิริสุขะ.html

1980 births
Living people
Khemupsorn Sirisukha
Khemupsorn Sirisukha
Khemupsorn Sirisukha
Khemupsorn Sirisukha
Khemupsorn Sirisukha
Khemupsorn Sirisukha
Khemupsorn Sirisukha
Khemupsorn Sirisukha